MEMX inc. was formed in October 2000 as a spin-off from Sandia National Laboratories' MicroElectoMechanical program, and was created to help commercialize Sandia's microelectromechanical systems (MEMS) technologies.  The MEMX technical team was instrumental in the formation of Sandia's MEMS program from 1990 to 2000.  Sandia National Laboratories is a government laboratory focused on developing technology in support of national security applications.  MEMX was formed to help mature the technology by deploying it in large volume commercial applications.

MEMX initially focused on development of Optical Cross Connect products for telecommunications applications.  With the almost complete collapse of the telecom industry in 2002, MEMX redirected its product development activities to disposable medical devices, ophthalmic devices, and various government projects.

MEMX investors include Agilent, Sequoia Capital and Austin Ventures.

MEMX presently has relationships with a number of Fortune 500 companies, and is developing a variety of MEMS-based products.

References
Sandia Labs Creates Memx Inc. in Popular Mechanics
Sandia LabNews story
Agilent press release

Nanotechnology institutions
Companies established in 2000
Nanotechnology companies
Sandia National Laboratories